Trusera was a Seattle-based social networking startup founded in 2007 by Keith Schorsch, a former Amazon executive.  Schorsch's struggle with Lyme disease in 2004 inspired him to create Trusera, a place where users can access information from people who have had similar medical experiences.  In October 2008, Trusera began releasing documentary-style videos of individuals with notable health experience, including Bill Krueger, former professional baseball player and father of a child diagnosed with autism.

Trusera was a part of the Health 2.0 movement, which drew millions of users to the web for health related information.

Trusera closed on May 27, 2009, citing funding difficulties on their blog.

Notes

External links
 Trusera
 Example of Trusera Resources in Autism
 Example of Trusera Resources in Breast Cancer
 Closing Announcement

Companies based in Seattle
Defunct social networking services
American social networking websites
Online support groups
Internet properties established in 2007
American medical websites